Nimbolouk Rural District is a rural district (dehestan) in Nimbolouk District, Qaen County, South Khorasan Province, Iran. At the 2006 census, its population was 5,072, in 1,461 families.  The rural district has 24 villages.

References 

Rural Districts of South Khorasan Province
Qaen County